Tallinn Lasnamae Russian School (Estonian: Tallinna Lasnamäe Vene Gümnaasium) is a public school in Tallinn, Estonia established in 1981, it was first named school No 48 and opened its doors to 889 students. 
School's first director was Irina Ivanovna Opekina.

In 2011 - 2013 the school participated in international cultural project "Comenius" (Speaking…..of culture – Kultuuridest rääkimine).

In 2013 the school passed the government check, the results were good.

Top Schools in Estonia
The school scored 60.3 points in the ranking of Top Schools in Estonia in 2010.

After School Activities 
 Estonian
 Girls Choir
 Boys Choir
 Musical Ensemble
 Drama Class
 Robotics Class
 Chess Class

References

External links

http://www.tallinn.ee/est/Uudis-Lasnamae-vene-gumnaasium-oli-jalgpalli-osavusfestivalil-parim

Schools in Tallinn